KTEL may refer to:

 K-tel, company known for their "as seen on TV" "greatest hits" records and CDs
 KTEL-CD, a low-power television station (channel 15, virtual channel 15) licensed to Albuquerque, New Mexico, United States
 KTEL-TV, a television station (channel 25) licensed to Carlsbad, New Mexico, United States
 KTEL (AM), a radio station (1490 AM) licensed to Walla Walla, Washington, United States
 KTEL (Greece), a transit communications company in Greece
 Perry County Municipal Airport (ICAO code KTEL)